Van Vleet is a census-designated place and unincorporated community in Chickasaw County, Mississippi, United States. Van Vleet has a post office with ZIP code 38877.

Van Vleet is located on the former Houston Branch of the Southern Railway.

A post office first began operation under the name Van Vleet in 1891.

It was first named as a CDP in the 2020 Census which listed a population of 95.

Demographics

2020 census

Note: the US Census treats Hispanic/Latino as an ethnic category. This table excludes Latinos from the racial categories and assigns them to a separate category. Hispanics/Latinos can be of any race.

References

Unincorporated communities in Chickasaw County, Mississippi
Unincorporated communities in Mississippi
Census-designated places in Chickasaw County, Mississippi